Samon Reider Rodríguez (born 28 October 1988) is a Cuban footballer who plays as a forward.

Youth career
Although born in Cuba, Rodríguez started his career at Italy for Castelfiorentino and following several impressive seasons with the club's youth system, he was signed by Serie A club, Juventus F.C. on 10 July 2003.

Rodríguez remained in the youth setup for 4 seasons. In 2006-07 season, he occasionally trained with first team and was awarded the no.39 shirt, by then Juventus coach Didier Deschamps. He also played at Campionato Nazionale Primavera before leaving on loan to Serie D side A.S.D. Cecina, where he was selected for the 2008 Torneo di Viareggio for Serie D selection. He scored 5 goals in 4 matches, which he scored a hat-trick against Novara's Berretti under-20 team and two goals against Pakhtakor's youth team.
With Cecina, he scored 1 goal in 10 appearances.

Career
In 2008 season he signed a 3-year contract extension with Juventus, the maximum length granted he could sign and left on loan to U.S. Poggibonsi, where in 5 months, he made 15 appearances with one goal. In the mid-season he returned to Juve and then left for U.S. Alessandria Calcio 1912 and his loan was extended in July 2009. With Alessandria, the young midfielder managed to make 31 appearances in all competitions, scoring 6 goals.

On 12 August 2010, Rodríguez joined Prima Divisione side Pergocrema in co-ownership deal.
 On 31 January 2011, Pergocrema's half was transferred to Bassano in exchange for the loan of Marco Criaco. In June Bassano acquired the remain 50% registration rights from Juventus.

On 25 July 2011 he left for A.S. Casale Calcio. On 7 July Siracusa also announced the signing of Rodríguez but never turned official.

On 27 August 2012 he signed for Serie D club Matera Calcio.

He eventually returned to former club Castelfiorentino in the Eccellenza. After four years, he signed for Seravezza Pozzi in the Serie D.

On 15 January 2019, Rodríguez signed for Portuguese side Olhanense.

On 23 September 2019, he was released from his contract with Reggiana by mutual consent.

On 1 October 2019 he joined Serie D club Audace Cerignola. In the first part of the season (before the definitive stop of the championships due to Covid-19) the player scored 14 goals.

On 9 August 2020 he joined Serie D club Casarano Calcio.

In July 2022, Rodríguez signed for newly-promoted Serie D club Livorno, being however released later in December of that year.

References

External links
 
 
 Profile at AIC.Football.it  
 

1988 births
Living people
Sportspeople from Guantánamo
Association football forwards
Cuban footballers
Juventus F.C. players
U.S. Poggibonsi players
U.S. Alessandria Calcio 1912 players
Bassano Virtus 55 S.T. players
Casale F.B.C. players
F.C. Matera players
S.C. Olhanense players
Serie C players
Cuban expatriate footballers
Expatriate footballers in Italy
Expatriate footballers in Portugal
Cuban expatriate sportspeople in Portugal
Italian people of Cuban descent